Faeries is a 1981 animated television special that appeared on CBS in the United States. It is based on the 1978 book Faeries, described and illustrated by Brian Froud and Alan Lee. The special was directed by Lee Mishkin with animation direction by Fred Hellmich,  executive produced by Thomas W. Moore, Anne Upson and Jean Moore Edwards, and was designed by Alan Aldridge. The special first aired on CBS on February 25, 1981.

Plot
A young man, Oisin "(pronounced O-sheen)" returns home with a group of huntsmen from an unsuccessful hunt when a deer, revealing herself to be Niamh (pronounced Nee-am and Nee’uv) a faerie princess, appears to him. She takes him to her father, the Faerie King, whose Shadow has come to life and now threatens Faerie Land. The King begs Oisin to travel to Squalor Web Castle and defeat the evil Shadow.

Oisin and his faerie helper Puck travel to the castle, encountering hags, goblins, merrows and other faerie creatures. They also save a kobold from evil trows. Eventually the three arrive at the lake, beyond which sits the castle. After meeting an Irish faerie who attempts to dissuade them from their mission, they arrive at the castle. Avoiding redcaps, the Shadow's evil soldiers, Oisin makes his way to the tallest tower, defeats the Shadow, and joins a celebration in Faerie Land before returning to his human companions.

Cast
Hans Conried as Faerie King / Shadow
Craig Schaefer as Oisin
Morgan Brittany as Princess Niamh
Frank Welker as Puck / Fir Darrig / Trow #1 / Hunter #1
Bob Arbogast as Kobold / Trow #2 / Hunter #2
June Foray as Hag #1
Linda Gary as Hag #2
Mel Welles as Trow #3 / Hunter #3

Home media and merchandising
Family Home Entertainment released the special on VHS and Betamax in the 1980s.

Henson Associates were the merchandising agents for Faeries.

Award nominations
Faeries was nominated for four Primetime Emmy Awards in 1981:

Outstanding Animated Program — Jean Moore Edwards, Fred Hellmich, Lee Mishkin, Thomas W. Moore,  Anne E. Upson, Norton Virgien (executive producers)
Outstanding Individual Achievement - Animated Programming — Alan Aldridge (teleplay), Lee Mishkin (teleplay), Christopher Gore (story)
Outstanding Individual Achievement - Animated Programming — Peter Aries (film editor) 
Outstanding Individual Achievement - Animated Programming — Peter Aries (film sound editor)

Notes

External links
 
 

1980s American animated films
1981 animated films
1981 films
1980s animated short films
1981 fantasy films
1981 television specials
American animated fantasy films
American children's animated films
American children's fantasy films
1980s American television specials
1980s animated television specials
Films based on books
High fantasy films
1980s children's animated films
Animated films based on Celtic mythology
Television about fairies and sprites
Animated films based on children's books
1980s English-language films